Cladonia carneola or the crowned cup lichen is a species of fruticose, cup lichen in the family Cladoniaceae. It was described as a new species by Swedish mycologist Elias Magnus Fries. Lichenicolous fungi that have been recorded growing on Cladonia carneola include Phaeopyxis punctum and Taeniolella beschiana.

See also
List of Cladonia species

References

carneola
Fungi of Europe
Taxa named by Elias Magnus Fries